Denny Siegel is an American actress, comedian and writer, best known for appearing on the American version of the British improv comedy show Whose Line is it Anyway?. She has also appeared as a recurring correspondent on Comedy Central's The Daily Show with Jon Stewart.

Before her stint on Whose Line?, she was a writer/performer on the sketch comedy show Quick Witz, which ran on NBC. Other TV credits include MTV F*UPS, PBS's TV-411, and host of the Metro Channel's Get Out of Town. 

Siegel has an extensive corporate resume as a writer, host and performer, and has also written several DVDs for the corporate market.  She has performed improv at various comedy festivals including The Montreal Comedy Festival, The Bass Red Triangle Comedy Tour, The Toyota Comedy Festival, and the Marshalls Women in Comedy Festival. She continues to perform comedy and theater at venues in Los Angeles, including The Improv and The Friars Club.

She was also seen wrestling with Larry David in HBO's Curb Your Enthusiasm.

Filmography

Film

Television

References

External links
 

Year of birth missing (living people)
Living people
American television actresses
American voice actresses
American women comedians
21st-century American women